Baby Daddy is an American sitcom created by Dan Berendsen that premieres on June 20, 2012, on ABC Family (Freeform). The series follows Ben, a man in his twenties, who gets the surprise of his life when a one-night stand leaves his baby at his doorstep. Ben decides to raise his daughter with the help of his brother, Danny, his two close friends, Riley and Tucker, and his sometimes-overbearing mother, Bonnie. The show is based on and inspired by the American film Three Men and a Baby (1987), and serves as the third installment overall in the titular franchise. Six seasons are produced in total, with the 100th, and final episode airing on May 22, 2017.

Plot summary
Ben Wheeler, a twenty-something bachelor, suddenly becomes a father when his baby daughter Emma is left at his doorstep. With the help of his overbearing mother Bonnie, his older brother Danny, and his two best friends Tucker and Riley, Ben works to turn his life around in order to provide for his daughter.

Characters

Main characters
 Benjamin Bon Jovi "Ben" Wheeler (Jean-Luc Bilodeau): The lead character of the series. He was living the life of a bachelor as a bartender in New York City with his buddy Tucker and his older brother Danny. His life was turned upside down when he opened his apartment door to find a baby girl left at his door by a one-night stand. The baby turned out to be his daughter Emma. At the beginning of the series, Ben's job was the same throughout the series, with the difference in season 4 when he and Danny became owners of the bar. He and Riley, next-door-neighbor and childhood friend of Ben, dated briefly twice. The relationship fails because Ben didn't live up to Riley's expectations. Eventually, it is revealed how strong Danny's feelings are for Riley. Ben initially denies this until Bonnie intervenes and points out that "Danny has loved Riley nearly his whole life" and tries to get the two together. Throughout Season 6, Ben constantly tries to find Elle (katie gill), a girl he has fallen for after seeing her three times in the same day during the season 5 finale.  In the series finale, Elle is seen looking for Ben throughout the series as well. At the conclusion of the series finale, Elle walks in to deliver Riley's son and Ben immediately recognizes Elle and they end up going out.
 Tucker Thurgood Marshall Dobbs (Tahj Mowry): Ben's best friend and roommate. Tucker is friendly towards everybody as long as they don't eat his food. Tucker has a love-hate and somewhat teasing relationship with Mrs. Wheeler. Ben encouraged Tucker to drop out of law school to pursue a career in television. When his father, Marshall Dobbs (Phil Morris), finds out about this he is at first furious and disowns Tucker. Mr. Dobbs later approves of Tucker's career in the same episode. Tucker has multiple relationships throughout the series but ultimately ends up with Sondra, a talkative fellow tenant whose voice is extremely shrill.
 Daniel Mellencamp "Danny" Wheeler (Derek Theler): Ben's older brother, who is a professional hockey player for the New York Rangers. His younger brother looks up to him, and is sometimes envious of Danny being better at everything. It is mentioned many times that Danny is their mother's favorite son, so much so that Mrs. Wheeler sometimes says she only has one son. In Season 4, Danny purchases Ben's place of employment, "Bar on B", for Ben. Danny has also been in love with Riley ever since he was six. Danny and Riley eventually end up together in seasons 5. In the season 5 finale, it is revealed that Riley is pregnant after Danny and Riley become very serious. During Season 6, Danny and Riley get married, and have a son, Puck.
 Bonnie N. Walker (née Prapinski; previously Wheeler) (Melissa Peterman): Ben and Danny's mother. She is a happy, outgoing, loud, and dramatic person who has a kind heart. Bonnie loves her kids and her granddaughter more than anything. She loves to drink; her favorite wine is chardonnay. It is hinted many times throughout the series that Bonnie might have a drinking problem. Bonnie has an on and off relationship with Brad Walker since season 3. She later marries Brad in an elevator. She had originally wanted to be a model but those plans changed after having Danny. She later became a realtor. Bonnie is in love with Bon Jovi, so much so that she named her second son "Benjamin Bon Jovi Wheeler". She describes herself as "a beautiful young woman with goals and ambitions".
 Riley Perrin (Chelsea Kane): Ben's close friend and Danny's best friend since they were little. Although Riley dates Ben on and off during the first few seasons of the show, she falls for Danny towards the end of Season 4, and subsequently begin a relationship with him. During the Season 5 season finale, it is revealed that Riley is pregnant. Danny and Riley get married in Season 6, and she gives birth to their son in the series finale. It has been said that she was extremely overweight in high school and, in the season 3 episode "Romancing the Phone" she says she lost 90 pounds. When they were kids, her nickname was "Rigantor" and could beat up the boys, enjoyed watching professional wrestling with Danny, and played field hockey as well as street hockey. She is highly intelligent. Despite having some difficulty with the LSATs, she did well enough to get accepted into law school. Riley is also extremely competitive. She has liked Ben ever since they were young, but only Danny initially knew. In the episode "Send in the Clowns", it is revealed that her aunt was her real mother. In the episode "House of Cards", she mentions a sister, presumably her cousin in reality, whom she claims to "hate".
 Emma Wheeler (Ali Louise and Susanne Allan Hartman in season 1; Mila and Zoey Beske in season 2; Ember and Harper Husak in season 3; Sura and Kayleigh Harris in seasons 4–6): Ben's daughter, who was left at his door by a one-night stand. Angela, Emma's mother, and Ben went on with their lives until she realized she was pregnant and gave birth to the child. Deciding that her acting career was more important than raising a child, she left Emma at Ben's front door and gave him full custody of Emma.

Recurring characters
 Brad Walker (Peter Porte): A handsome real estate agent who had an on and off relationship with Bonnie since season 3. He had a twin brother named Tad. On the season 4 episode "Parental Guidance", Brad proposed to Bonnie, with her saying yes. Brad and Bonnie officially got married in season 5.
 Dr. Amy Shaw (Lacey Chabert): A psychologist for the New York Rangers and Danny's girlfriend in season 2. She cares deeply for Danny but is constantly worried his feelings for Riley will drive him away. She eventually realizes Danny still has feelings for Riley and breaks up with him in the episode "Surprise!". In season 3, Amy shows up and announces that she is engaged to another man.
 Fitch Douglas (Matt Dallas): Son of a millionaire and Riley's boyfriend in season 2. Fitch does not speak to his family for he feels their money corrupts them. He constantly travels to Africa to help the children and orphanages, having a long-distance relationship with Riley. He is seemingly killed in Africa but later turns up alive at his memorial and proposes to Riley. She regretfully declines claiming she is not the one for him. In season 3, he comes back and Riley attempts to make him her rebound to forget Ben.
 Philip Farlow (Christopher O'Shea): A college professor whom Riley briefly dated in season 3.
 Georgie Farlow (Mallory Jansen): Philip's sister who briefly dated Ben, but later developed feelings for Danny in season 3. She is a fashion photographer for Vogue magazine. She doesn't like Riley, but begins to accept her for Danny's sake in the episode "Foos it or Lose It". She breaks up with Danny via voicemail at the beginning of season 4.
 Angela (Mimi Gianopulos): The mother of Emma and the ex-girlfriend of Ben. When her daughter was 3 months old, she abandoned her on Ben's doorstep. She's an aspiring actress who had since moved to California. Although she appears in several episodes, Angela never took the role of Emma's mother as she would often place her career first.
 Mary Hart: A fictionalized version of herself, who has a daytime talk show that Tucker is the producer of. While she initially comes off as a kind person on camera, she is very rude and mean off camera, especially towards Tucker. She appeared on the show between season 3 to mid-season 5.
 Megan (Grace Phipps): A day care worker whom Ben dated in season 2. She broke up with him after he almost lost her dog.
 Ray Wheeler (Greg Grunberg): Ben and Danny's father. He is divorced from Bonnie and doesn't get along with her. He makes amends with Bonnie by finally telling his family that he's in a relationship with a man named Steve (Robert Gant). 
 Sondra (Rachna Khatau): A neighbor who's known for her talkativeness and distinctive high-pitched voice. 
 Robyn (Christa B. Allen): Riley's co worker and Danny's girlfriend in season 4. 
 Zoey (Jonna Walsh): A single mother living in the same building as Ben, introduced in season 5. She shares the same interests as Ben, but is reluctant to give in to her romantic feelings because of Ben's immaturity.
 Sam Saffe (Daniella Monet): The manager of the Bar on B in season 5. She went to high school with Ben, Danny and Riley. Ben had a crush on her in high school but she never reciprocated his feelings. She and Riley did not like each other, despite frequent attempts in both ends to become friends. Sam briefly dates Ben in season 5. 
 Elle Ryan (Katie Gill): A woman that Ben has met a few brief times and is convinced is his soulmate. In the season 6 finale, it is revealed that she had been looking for Ben, as he had been looking for her. In the same episode, she and Ben finally meet and end up dating after she is paged to deliver Riley and Danny's son, Puck.
 Carter (Jase Whitaker): Ben's bartender co-worker at the bar Ben eventually ends up owning.

Episodes

Development and production
The series was given a green-light on February 2, 2012 and began production on March 28. The second season premiered on May 29, 2013, followed by the third on January 15, 2014. The fourth season premiered on October 22, 2014, with the series' first Halloween episode "Strip or Treat". The fifth season premiered on February 3, 2016. The sixth and the final season premiered on March 13, 2017.

Broadcast
The series premiered in the United States on June 20, 2012, on ABC Family.

In New Zealand, the show premiered on TVNZ's TV2 beginning on December 14, 2013.

In Australia, the series airs on Fox8, with season 1 premiering 29 September 2013, with season 2 returning on 4 May 2014, and season 3 returning on 24 August the same year.

In the United Kingdom, the series began airing on E4 on February 16, 2015. The same year, the second season started on March 2, followed by the third in April and the fourth in September. The fifth season aired on 5 September 2016. The sixth and final season aired in 2017.

In Israel, the series airs weeknights (two episodes each) since July 2016. In South Africa, the series aired on 5 September 2015.

In Italy, the series began airing on Joi Premium, pay channel on the DTT platform Mediaset Premium from 22 February to 22 March 2013. The second, third, fourth and fifth seasons were broadcast on the streaming platform Mediaset Infinity from 2015 to 2016. The sixth season were made entirely available on October 4, 2017, on the streaming platform Mediaset Infinity.

In Brazil the series premiered on September 8, 2014, on the Sony Channel, by TV Globo in December 2017, and on March 5, 2021, the six seasons were made available on the streaming platform Disney+.

In Portugal, the series debuted on AXN White on May 5, 2013, and the last episode was broadcast on July 5, 2017.

International versions

Reception

Critical reception 
On the review aggregator website Rotten Tomatoes, the first season holds an approval rating of 33% based on 12 reviews, with an average rating of 5.10/10. The site's critics consensus reads: "Baby Daddy is moderately well-executed, but it can't quite overcome its stale premise and shortage of laughs". On Metacritic, the first season of the show holds a score 51 out of 100 based on reviews from 8 critics, indicating "mixed or average reviews".

Accolades

Notes

References

External links
 
 
 Baby Daddy on TheTVDB

2012 American television series debuts
2017 American television series endings
2010s American sitcoms
ABC Family original programming
English-language television shows
Freeform (TV channel) original programming
Television series about brothers
Television series about dysfunctional families
Television series by Disney–ABC Domestic Television
Television shows filmed in Los Angeles
Television shows set in New York City